Anet is a commune in the Eure-et-Loir department in the Centre-Val de Loire region of north-central France. It lies 14 km north-northeast of Dreux between the rivers Eure and Vesgre, the latter flowing into the former some 4 km northeast of Anet town hall.

History
The town possesses the remains of a castle, the Château d'Anet, built in the middle of the 16th century by Henry II for Diana of Poitiers. Near it is the plain of Ivry-la-Bataille, where Henry IV defeated the armies of the Catholic League in 1590.

Demographics

Popular culture
The opening scene of the James Bond film "Thunderball" was shot in Anet.

See also
Communes of the Eure-et-Loir department

References

Communes of Eure-et-Loir